Michael Forsyth may refer to:

 Michael Forsyth, Baron Forsyth of Drumlean (born 1954), British Conservative politician
 Michael Forsyth (footballer) (born 1966), English former footballer